Tillandsia paraensis is a species of flowering plant in the genus Tillandsia. This species is native to Bolivia, Peru, Ecuador, Colombia, the Guianas, Brazil and Venezuela.

References

paraensis
Flora of South America
Plants described in 1894